Teresa Ann Cheatham-Crosby (née Cheatham) is a vocal instructor from Wellington, Alabama who was named Miss Alabama 1978 and finished first runner-up at Miss America 1979.

Early life
She attended Jacksonville State University, graduating in 1979 with a Bachelor of Arts degree in vocal performance with a minor in drama.

Miss Alabama
Entering the statewide pageant as Miss Point Mallard, Cheatham-Crosby won the title of Miss Alabama in 1978. She finished first runner-up at Miss America 1979 on September 9, 1978. She won the talent competition and the swimsuit competition in the Miss America Pageant.

Life after Miss Alabama
Following her reign as Miss Alabama, she toured England, Iceland, and Germany performing as part of the Miss America USO tour along with several other contestants in the pageant.

Cheatham married Tommy Charles "Chuck" Stricklin in Anniston, Alabama on May 26, 1990. Since 2001, she has worked as a vocal instructor at Jacksonville State University.

References

External links
 
Teresa Cheatham-Crosby - Jacksonville State University Department of Music

1957 births
Living people
American beauty pageant winners
Jacksonville State University alumni
Miss Alabama winners
Miss America 1979 delegates
Miss America Preliminary Talent winners
Miss America Preliminary Swimsuit winners
People from Calhoun County, Alabama